Kauser Parveen (1933 - 1967) was a Pakistani playback singer during the 1950s and 1960s. She is known for vocalizing songs like, "O Maina Na Jane Kya Hogaya Kahan Dil Khogaya", "Pal Pal Jhoomun Jhoom Ke Gaun", and the film lullaby, "Raaj Dularey, Meri Ankhiyon Ke Taray". She was the younger sister of actress Asha Posley.

Early life and family
Kausar was born in Patiala, Punjab, British India, in 1933. She migrated to Pakistan, after the partition of India, along with her family. She was the daughter of Inayat Ali Nath, who was the music director of first Pakistani film Teri Yaad (1948).  She was the youngest sister of actresses Asha Posley, Najma Begum and Rani Kiran.

Career
Kausar began her singing career in the early 1950s and rose to fame when she gave her voice for Master Inayat Hussain and G.A. Chisthi in the films, Gumnaam (1954) and Sassi (1954). 1955 was a pivotal year in her career as a singer. Under the direction of Master Inayat Hussain, she sang for two films, Inteqam and Qatil. While Qatil is best known for the Iqbal Bano's sad melody, "Ulfat Ki Nai Manzil Ko Chala", Kauser held her own with a love solo, "O Maena, Na Janey Kia Ho Gaya", which was filmed on Sabiha Khanum. Another highlight of 1955 was a lullaby from the film Naukar, "Raj Dularey Tohe Dil Mein Basaoun," which is still remembered today and became one of the most popular songs of her career and it went on to become one of her most notable songs.

In the late 1950s, Kauser's popularity began to fade with the advent of Zubaida Khanum. However, her versatility as a playback vocalist was demonstrated in two superhit films released in 1957; Waada and Saat Lakh. She performed the tragic song "Sitamgar Mujhe Bewafa Janta Hai" for Saat Lakh. She sung in a classical duet with Sharafat Ali for the film Waada (1957): "Baar Baar Barsey Morey Nain, Mohe Kaisey Mile Chain". Rashid Attre composed the soundtrack for both of these hits. Kausar sang 273 songs in 90 films.

Personal life
Kausar was married to the music director Akhter Hussain Ankhiyan and she had one son.

Death
She died at a young on December 30, 1967, at the age of 34 at Lahore, Pakistan.

Popular songs
Some of her hit songs are:
 O Maina, Na Jane Kya Hogaya Kahan Dil Khogaya Sung by Kausar Parveen, lyrics by Qateel Shifai, film Qatil (1955)
 Raaj Dularey Tohe Dil Main Bithaun Tujhe Geet Suaon Sung by Kausar Parveen, lyrics by Qateel Shifai, music by G.A. Chishti, film Noukar (1955)
 Kab Tak Raho Ge Akhir Aji Yun Door Door Ham Se Sung by Kausar Parveen, lyrics by Qateel Shifai, music by Tasadduq Hussain, film Chhoti Begum (1956)
 Baar Baar Barse Morey Nain Morey Naina Sung by Kausar Parveen and Sharafat Ali, lyrics by Saifuddin Saif, music by Rashid Attre, Waada (1957)
 Sitamgar Mujhe Bewafa Janta Hai Mere Dil Ki Halat Khuda Janta Hai Sung by Kausar Parveen, lyrics by Saifuddin Saif, music by Rashid Attre, film Saat Lakh (1957)
 Pal Pal Jhoomun Jhoom Ke Gaun Sung by Kausar Parveen, lyrics by Qateel Shifai, music by Khawaja Khurshid Anwar, film Zeher-e-Ishq (1958)

References

External links
 

1933 births
Pakistani playback singers
20th-century Pakistani women singers
Pakistani ghazal singers
Women ghazal singers
Pakistani classical singers
Pakistani women singers
Urdu playback singers
Pakistani radio personalities
1967 deaths
Urdu-language singers
Singers from Lahore
Musicians from Patiala
Punjabi-language singers
Radio personalities from Lahore